Al-Salam Stadium may refer to:

Al Ahly Stadium Formerly Al Salam Stadium 
Al-Salam Stadium, Umm al-Fahm, Israel